Lerato Walaza is a South African actress who appears in the TV series Shuga. She was a recurring character who was still in Shuga when the series went into a nightly mini-series to highlight issues surrounding Coronavirus. The series is filmed by the actors and the story will be based in Nigeria, South Africa, Kenya and Côte d'Ivoire.

Life
Walaza attended Tshwane University of Technology where she graduated in drama.

She came to notice when she was given the role of Zamo in series one of MTV Shuga. She has the role of a young single parent showing the struggles of balancing life with bringing up a child even with the help of your mother. She was a recurring character who was also in series two.

She has appeared in the movie "Letters of Hope" which was screened at the Johannesburg Film Festival in 2019. The latter film was chosen as the opening film for the 5th South African International Film Festival.

In 2019 Walaza fulfilling MTV's educational mission by discussing condom usage on YouTube. She was still in MTV Shuga went it went into a mini-series titled MTV Shuga Alone Together highlighting the problems of Coronavirus on 20 April 2020. The show is written by Tunde Aladese and Nkiru Njoku and broadcast for 70 nights - its backers include the United Nations. The series will be based in Nigeria, South Africa, Kenya and Côte d'Ivoire and the story will be explained with on-line conversations between the characters. All of the filming will be done by the actors who include Mohau Cele, Nomalanga Shozi and Jemima Osunde.

References

External links
 

Living people
Year of birth missing (living people)
21st-century South African actresses
Tshwane University of Technology alumni
South African television actresses